The Villain is a 1662 tragedy by the English writer Thomas Porter. It was originally staged by the Duke's Company at the Lincoln's Inn Fields Theatre in London. The first cast included Thomas Betterton as Monsieur Brisac, Henry Harris as  Monsieur Beaupre, John Young as Bontefeu, Samuel Sandford as Maligni and Mary Betterton as Bellmont. William Davenant wrote the epilogue.

It has been described as the only genuine tragedy of the decade, given the fashion for tragicomedy. Samuel Sandford was acclaimed for his role of the villain, and play was a popular success.

References

Bibliography
 Maguire, Nancy Klein. Regicide and Restoration: English Tragicomedy, 1660-1671. Cambridge University Press, 1992.
 Van Lennep, W. The London Stage, 1660-1800: Volume One, 1660-1700. Southern Illinois University Press, 1960.

1662 plays
West End plays
Tragedy plays
Plays by Thomas Porter